William David Johnson (born January 21, 1987) is a Canadian soccer player who plays for Central Florida Panthers in the National Premier Soccer League and the Central Florida Crusaders in the National Indoor Soccer League. A versatile midfielder, Johnson has represented Canada internationally.

Club career

Youth 
Johnson was born in Canada, but moved shortly afterwards to England where he started playing soccer, attending the Merchant Taylors' School in Crosby, near Liverpool. When he was 10 his family once again moved, this time to Woodridge, Illinois, and he played youth soccer for the Sockers FC Chicago. Johnson later returned to England to play for the youth team of Blackburn Rovers in the 2003–04 season. However, after the season he left Blackburn and returned to Illinois. He was on the roster of Chicago Fire Reserves in the USL Premier Development League, but did not feature in any PDL games.

Chicago Fire 
In 2005, Johnson was signed by the Chicago Fire as a discovery player. Johnson played most of the year for the reserve team in the MLS Reserve League but he did play in six games for the first team, where he scored a goal. After the year the Fire offered him a $28,000 contract, which he rejected. Johnson then went on a trial with Heerenveen, which was successful, and they signed him to a one-year deal plus a club option for two more years.

Heerenveen 
He made 14 appearances, all as a sub, for Heerenveen in the 2006–2007 season, scoring the second goal in a 2–0 defeat of NEC Nijmegen on December 27, 2006. For the 2007–2008 season he was on loan to Doetinchem side De Graafschap, who were promoted as champions of the Dutch Eerste Divisie. Again he mostly made sub appearances and he returned to SC Heerenveen for the 2008–09 season. While back training in Heerenveen for preseason, MLS team Real Salt Lake offered Johnson a contract, which he accepted.

Real Salt Lake 
Johnson signed with Major League Soccer on August 16, 2008. Chicago traded his rights to Real Salt Lake in return for a conditional 4th round pick in the 2009 MLS SuperDraft and a 2nd round pick in the 2011 MLS SuperDraft.

Johnson won the MLS Goal of the Year Award in 2008 for a goal scored against FC Dallas on October, 18 in Rio Tinto Stadium. He was called up for the 2009 MLS All-Star Game against English Premier League side Everton. He was one of three players to score their penalties in the penalty shootout against American goalkeeper Tim Howard. He started and played 45 minutes for Real Salt Lake in the 2009 MLS Cup final against the Los Angeles Galaxy despite a bout with food poisoning, with his side ultimately winning in a penalty shootout.

Portland Timbers 
Johnson was traded to the Portland Timbers on December 3, 2012, as part of a salary cap issue, along with the trade or release of six other Real Salt Lake players, including starters Jámison Olave, Fabián Espíndola, and substitute Jonny Steele. Johnson was named team captain by coach Caleb Porter on February 26, 2013; former team captain Jack Jewsbury was renamed club captain. On March 30, 2013, Johnson scored his first goal for Portland against Colorado Rapids scoring both goals in 2–2 draw, he was awarded MLS player of the week for his performance. Johnson was put on the 2014 MLS All Star roster. He was brought in at halftime, became captain at the 73rd minute after Landon Donovan was substituted, and at the 88th minute received a yellow card for a hard tackle on Bayern midfielder Bastian Schweinsteiger, the latter received a bruised ankle and had to exit what would be his last game until November. A collision with Toronto FC defender Mark Bloom early in the September 27, 2014 game fractured the tibia and fibula in Johnson's right leg, ending his season early.

Toronto FC 
In December 2015, Johnson was traded to Toronto FC in exchange for a conditional second-round pick in the 2017 MLS SuperDraft and targeted allocation money. On May 1, 2016, he scored his first goal for Toronto in a 2–1 away defeat to his former team, the Portland Timbers. On June 29, 2016, he scored the winning goal in the 95th minute of the Canadian Championship for Toronto to defeat the Vancouver Whitecaps 2–2 on aggregate, winning on away goals. In scoring that goal, Johnson collided with Whitecaps goalkeeper David Ousted, resulting in a tibial plateau fracture of his left leg.

Orlando City SC 
In December 2016, Orlando City SC announced that they had signed Johnson to a two-year contract, with an option for a third year. Johnson's contract expired after the 2019 season. He retired from professional soccer shortly after, taking up a financial advisor role with Morgan Stanley.

Central Florida Panthers/Crusaders 
On May 2, 2021, Johnson made a return to soccer, signing as a player and player-mentor with developmental NPSL team Central Florida Panthers.

In August 2022, he signed with the Central Florida Crusaders of the National Indoor Soccer League.

International career 
In the summers of 2005 and 2007, Johnson played for the U-20 Canadian national team at the 2005 and 2007 World Youth Championships in the Netherlands and Canada respectively. Johnson also played very well for the Canada U-23 side during the 2008 CONCACAF Olympic Qualifying Tournament. Johnson scored three goals in three games during the tournament. However, Canada failed to qualify for the Olympics after falling 3–0 to the United States in the semifinals.

He made his senior debut for Canada in a November 2005 friendly match against Luxembourg. By December 2009, he had earned a total of 10 caps, scoring no goals. He has so far represented Canada in two FIFA Tournaments Johnson provided the assist to André Hainault winning goal against Belarus on March 29, 2011. He scored his first international goal in a World Cup Qualifying match against Saint Lucia on September 2, 2011.

On June 27, 2013, Johnson was listed as a part of the confirmed 23-man squad for Colin Miller's Canada squad for the 2013 CONCACAF Gold Cup, making it his third consecutive Gold Cup. Miller named Johnson as team captain for the tournament.

On December 12, 2013, Johnson was awarded the Canadian Men's Player of the Year by the CSA for the first time of his career. Johnson beat out two-time winner Atiba Hutchinson who was voted second and Patrice Bernier in third for the award.

After almost two years since his last call-up, during which he dealt with illness, injuries, and personal commitments, Johnson was recalled to the national team by Canada coach Benito Floro for 2018 FIFA World Cup qualification matches against Dominica on June 2, 2015.

In May 2019, John Herdman recalled Johnson to the national team for the 2019 CONCACAF Gold Cup.

Personal life 
Johnson's grandfather is Brian Birch, who had a successful career with Bolton Wanderers, including an FA Cup winners medal in 1958. Johnson was married to Caroline Childs. They have a daughter, Arabella Capri, born October 2012, and a son, Jaxx Beckett, born September 5, 2014.
Johnson also holds U.S. citizenship.

On September 6, 2017, Johnson was arrested on a domestic battery charge against his wife, and suspended from the team while the incident was being investigated by both local police and the league. No charges were brought and in October 2017 Johnson was reinstated by the league.

Career statistics

Club

International

International goals 
: Canada score listed first, score column indicates score after each Johnson goal.

Honours

Club
Real Salt Lake
MLS Cup: 2009

Portland Timbers
MLS Cup: 2015

Toronto FC
Canadian Championship: 2016
 Trillium Cup: 2016

Individual 
MLS All-Star (3) : 2009, 2013, 2014
MLS Best XI: 2013
Timbers Supporters Player of the Year: 2013
Canadian Player of the Year: 2013
MLS Goal of the Year: 2008

See also
 List of current Major League Soccer players with national team caps

References

External links
 
 
 
 

1987 births
Living people
Soccer players from Toronto
People from Woodridge, Illinois
Association football forwards
Canadian soccer players
Canada men's youth international soccer players
Canada men's under-23 international soccer players
Canada men's international soccer players
2009 CONCACAF Gold Cup players
2011 CONCACAF Gold Cup players
2013 CONCACAF Gold Cup players
Canadian expatriate soccer players
Canadian expatriate sportspeople in the United States
Canadian expatriate sportspeople in the Netherlands
Chicago Fire U-23 players
Chicago Fire FC players
SC Heerenveen players
De Graafschap players
Real Salt Lake players
Portland Timbers players
Portland Timbers 2 players
Toronto FC players
Eredivisie players
Major League Soccer players
USL Championship players
Expatriate soccer players in the United States
Expatriate footballers in the Netherlands
Major League Soccer All-Stars
Canadian people of English descent
Orlando City SC players
2019 CONCACAF Gold Cup players
National Premier Soccer League players
Indoor soccer players